Statistics of Swedish football Division 3 for the 1953–54 season.

League standings

Norra Norrland 1953–54

Mellersta Norrland 1953–54

Södra Norrland 1953–54

Norra Svealand 1953–54

Östra Svealand 1953–54

Västra Svealand 1953–54

Östra Götaland 1953–54

Västra Götaland 1953–54

Södra Götaland 1953–54

Footnotes

References 

Swedish Football Division 3 seasons
3
Swed